Doane Ethredge Perry (born June 16, 1954) is an American musician, composer and author. From 1984 to 2011 he was drummer and percussionist with the band Jethro Tull and has also appeared on hundreds of recordings spanning multiple genres on records, film and television.

Early life
From New York City, Perry began playing the piano at age seven and then took up drums at eleven. After hearing The Beatles, he decided to take up drums, because of what he describes as "the possibility, however unlikely that might have been, of young girls chasing me down the street, if I took up the drums." By the time he was 14, he was working with his own band on weekends, and continued to do so until he graduated high school at the age of 17.

He attended Browning, St. Bernard's and Collegiate Schools in New York City. Later he briefly attended New York University and extension programs at The New School, Rutgers, and Juilliard, followed by extensive private musical study in jazz and orchestral percussion.

Musical career

By the time Perry was 18, he turned professional while simultaneously attempting to attend college. This led to a serious conflict, finally resolved, when he opted to pursue music full-time. He began gaining a broader musical background in a wide variety of styles, which included genres such as rock, pop, jazz, fusion, R&B, classical, world and folk. He has appeared on over 100 successful records within his musical career in various musical capacities as a performer, composer and producer, that have achieved gold to multi-platinum status.

He is a member of the faculty of the Musician’s Institute in Hollywood, Ca. from 1988–1996.

He continues to perform solo clinics at Drum Festivals and Music Colleges around the world.

In 1992, he released a critically acclaimed instructional video entitled Creative Listening, still widely used in the curriculum of music schools in the USA and abroad.

Jethro Tull
In 1984 Perry joined Grammy Award-winning band Jethro Tull as drummer and percussionist to replace Gerry Conway. He is the second member of Jethro Tull to have been born in the United States; (the first was fellow drummer Mark Craney). He continued to record and tour until the band's 2011 hiatus, and was its third longest standing member of 28 years. Perry played on numerous Jethro Tull albums and DVDs from 1984 - 2011.

Equipment
Doane Perry has used a wide variety of equipment over the years. He uses different drum kits depending on several factors, such as whether he is performing live or recording in the studio. On later Tull tours and records he used Premier's Artist Series maple drums, but would occasionally use birch Genistas or maple Signia Series drums, Paiste cymbals, DW Pedals & Hardware, Pro Mark Drumsticks, Remo Drum Heads, Rhythm Tech Percussion, LP Percussion.

Personal life
In 1990 he married actress Heather Woodruff. They currently reside in Woodland Hills, California.

Selected Discography

With Maxus
 Maxus (1981)

With Lou Reed
 The Blue Mask (1982)

With Dragon
 Dreams of Ordinary Men (1986)

With Jethro Tull
 Crest of a Knave (1987) 
 Rock Island (1989)
 Catfish Rising (1991)
 Roots to Branches (1995)
 J-Tull Dot Com (1999)
 The Jethro Tull Christmas Album (2003)

With Magellan
 Impending Ascension (1993)

With Ian Anderson
 Divinities: Twelve Dances with God (1995)
 Rupi's Dance (2003)

With Martin Barre
 The Meeting (1998)
 Martin Barre (2012)

With Michelle Young
 Marked for Madness (2001)

With Dave Pegg
 A Box of Pegg's (2007)

References

External links
 Biography at the official jethro Tull website
 Jethro Tull official website

1954 births
Jethro Tull (band) members
Living people
People from Mount Kisco, New York
20th-century American drummers
American male drummers
21st-century American drummers